Roman Ivanovych Ivanychuk (27 May 1929 — 17 September 2016) was a Soviet and Ukrainian writer and politician. He was the 1985 laureate of the Shevchenko National Prize. Between 1990 and 1994 he was a deputy of the Verkhovna Rada. In 2009, he received a title of Hero of Ukraine.

Ivanychuk was born in Trach, currently in Kosiv Raion, Ivano-Frankivsk Oblast. He studied languages at University of Lviv and graduated in 1957. He worked as a school teacher between 1957 and 1963; he published short stories and novels since 1958. After 1963, Ivanychuk worked as an editor of Zhovten magazine until 1990. In 1995, he became a professor at University of Lviv and taught there until his death. He died in Lviv in 2016.

Bibliography
Ivanychuk wrote around 15 historical novels, and a number of short-story collections. Some of his books were translated into French and Russian.
 Прут несе кригу, short-story collection (1958);
 Не рубайте ясенів, short-story collection (1961);
 Під склепінням храму, short-story collection (1962);
 Край битого шляху, novel (1961);
 Тополина заметіль, short-story collection (1965);
 Мальви, novel (1968); also published as Яничари;
 Дім на горі, short-story collection (1969);
 Сиві ночі, short-story collection (1975);
 Місто, novel (1977);
 Черлене вино, novel (1977);
 Манускрипт з вулиці Руської, novel (1979);
 На перевалі, short-story collection (1980);
 Вода з каменю, novel (1982);
 Четвертий вимір, novel (1984);
 Сьоме небо, novel (1985);
 Шрами на скалі, novel (1987);
 Журавлиний крик, novel (1988);
 Бо війна війною, novel (1989);
 Орда, novel (1992);
 Вогненні стовпи, novel (2006);
 Хресна проща, novel (2011);
 Торговиця, novel (2012)

References

External links

1929 births
2016 deaths
20th-century Ukrainian writers
21st-century Ukrainian writers
People from Ivano-Frankivsk Oblast
People from Stanisławów Voivodeship
University of Lviv alumni
First convocation members of the Verkhovna Rada
Recipients of the title of Hero of Ukraine
Recipients of the Order of Merit (Ukraine), 2nd class
Recipients of the Order of Merit (Ukraine), 3rd class
Recipients of the Order of the Red Banner of Labour
Recipients of the Shevchenko National Prize
Historical novelists
Ukrainian-language writers
Soviet male writers
Ukrainian fiction writers
Ukrainian male writers
Burials at Lychakiv Cemetery